Hodkovce is a village and municipality in Košice-okolie District in the Kosice Region of eastern Slovakia.

History
The village was first mentioned in 1318.

Geography
It has a population of about 250 people.

Culture

Hodkovce has a single Roman Catholic church, built in 1832 in Classical style with Baroque motifs. It contains a few relics from the nineteenth century, for example, an oil painting of the Lord's sacrifice (Karol Völck, 1820) and a sculpture of St. Anna, Virgin Mary and Baby Jesus (polychrome, woodcarving).

Genealogical resources 
Records for genealogical research are available at the Statny Archiv (state archive) in Kosice, Slovakia.

 Roman Catholic church records (births/marriages/deaths): 1761–1907 (parish B)
 Greek Catholic church records (births/marriages/deaths): 1870–1902 (parish B)

See also
 List of municipalities and towns in Slovakia

References

External links
Surnames of living people in Hodkovce

Villages and municipalities in Košice-okolie District